Ivan Karamanov (Bulgarian: Иван Караманов) (born 23 April 1981 in Plovdiv) is a Bulgarian football player, currently playing as a midfielder.

Career
Ivan Karamanov began his professional career during the 1999–2000 season with Lokomotiv Plovdiv. He made his official debut on 24 October 1999, in a match against Septemvri Sofia. In his career Karamanov also played for Rodopa Smolyan, Spartak Plovdiv, Beroe Stara Zagora, Azerbaijani FK Qarabağ, Kazakhstani FC Irtysh Pavlodar and Latvian FK Riga.

In September 2009, he was released from the team and a week later he joined the city rivals Botev Plovdiv. On 23 September, Karamanov signed a one-year contract with the Canaries. A few days later, he was given the vice-captain's armband. He made his re-debut for Botev on 26 September 2009 against Slavia Sofia in the seventh round of the A PFG but left when the club went bankrupt in the early 2010.

Third place with FC Riga Latvia 2007
,winner-Champion with New Radiant -Maldives 2012,
President cup with New Radiant-Maldives 2012

References

External links
Profile at Guardian's Stats Centre

1981 births
Living people
Bulgarian footballers
Expatriate footballers in Azerbaijan
Association football midfielders
Expatriate footballers in Kazakhstan
PFC Lokomotiv Plovdiv players
Botev Plovdiv players
PFC Rodopa Smolyan players
FC Spartak Plovdiv players
PFC Beroe Stara Zagora players
New Radiant S.C. players
FC Oborishte players
First Professional Football League (Bulgaria) players
Bulgarian expatriate sportspeople in Kazakhstan
Bulgarian expatriate sportspeople in Azerbaijan